Le Bourg-Saint-Léonard is a former commune in the Orne department in northwestern France. On 1 January 2017, it was merged into the new commune Gouffern en Auge.

Population

See also
Communes of the Orne department

References

Former communes of Orne